The 23rd Guam Legislature was a meeting of the Guam Legislature. It convened in Hagatna, Guam on January 2, 1995 and ended on January 6, 1997, during the 1st and 2nd years of Carl T.C. Gutierrez's 1st Gubernatorial Term.

In the 1994 Guamanian general election, the Democratic Party of Guam won a thirteen-to-eight (13-8) majority of seats in the Guam Legislature.

It had been expected that Senator Thomas C. "Tom" Ada would be chosen by his colleagues as Speaker of the Guam Legislature, but a group of Democratic and Republican Senators elected Parkinson as Speaker, instead.

Party Summary

Leadership

Legislative
 Speaker: Don Parkinson
 Vice Speaker: Theodore "Ted" S. Nelson
 Legislative Secretary: Judith Won Pat-Borja

Membership

References 

Politics of Guam
Political organizations based in Guam
Legislature of Guam